The Runaround is a 1946 American black-and-white film directed by Charles Lamont and starring Rod Cameron, Ella Raines, Broderick Crawford, and Frank McHugh. The film is also known as Deadly Enemies.

Plot
Two professional private detectives (Rod Cameron and Broderick Crawford) leave their agency to be independently hired by a wealthy man who desperately wants to find his eloping daughter (Ella Raines).

Cast
Rod Cameron as Eddie Kildane
Ella Raines as Penelope Hampton
Broderick Crawford as Louis Prentice
Frank McHugh as Wally Quayle
Samuel S. Hinds as Norman Hampton
George Cleveland as Feenan
Joe Sawyer as Hutchins
Nana Bryant as Mrs. Hampton
Charles Coleman as Butler
Jack Overman as Cusack

References

External links
 
 
 

1946 films
Universal Pictures films
1946 mystery films
American mystery films
American black-and-white films
Films directed by Charles Lamont
Films scored by Frank Skinner
1940s English-language films
1940s American films